"Tell Me Why" is a song written by John Booth Aclin, and recorded by the American country music artist Earl Thomas Conley. It was released in October 1981 as the third single from the album Fire & Smoke. The song reached number 10 on the Billboard Hot Country Singles & Track chart.

Chart performance

References

1981 singles
Earl Thomas Conley songs
RCA Records singles
1981 songs